The Calliope River is a river located in Central Queensland, Australia.

The river rises in the Calliope Range inland from the industrial port city of Gladstone, flows past the town of Calliope, before emptying into the Pacific Ocean just north of Gladstone.

Oaky, Paddock and Larcom Creeks are the main tributaries of the river. The major industry in the river area is the raising of beef cattle. Like most sub tropical and tropical estuaries, the waters of the river may contain box jellyfish for many kilometres upstream.  This venomous, marine animal poses a threat to swimmers.

The Calliope River Historical Village is located beside the Calliope River on the Old Bruce Highway at River Ranch, adjacent to the Bruce Highway.

See also

References

External links

Rivers of Queensland
Bodies of water of the Coral Sea
Gladstone Region